Fredrick Lee Kerley (born May 7, 1995) is an American track and field sprinter who started his career competing in the 400 meters until 2020, when he transitioned to the 100 meters and 200 meters. He has earned several medals at the World Championships in the 400 m and 4 × 400 m relay including an individual bronze and a relay gold at the 2019 edition. Kerley claimed 100 m gold in the 2022 edition.

His personal best time of 43.64 seconds makes him the eighth fastest man in history over 400 m. During the pandemic, Kerley chose to focus on the 100 m during the Olympic cycle to improve his basic speed for future attempts at a sub-43 400 m. The decision to move down paid off as he won the silver medal in the 100 m at the 2020 Tokyo Olympics with a 9.84 performance. His personal best time of 9.76 seconds makes him the sixth fastest man in history over the straightaway sprint.

Kerley is one of only 3 men along with Michael Norman and Wayde van Niekerk to go sub-10 seconds in 100 m, sub-20 seconds in 200 m and sub-44 seconds in 400 m.

Early life and college
Kerley attended Taylor High School and his youth team was the College Station Sprinters in College Station, Texas. Afterwards he attended South Plains College from 2013 to 2015 before transferring to Texas A&M.

In 2016, Fred Kerley tried out for the Olympic team at the USA Olympic Trials. He did not qualify out of his heat, but he went on to represent the United States at the NACAC Under-23 Championships where he anchored the 4 × 100 meters relay team to gold.

In March 2017, he won the 400 m at the NCAA Division I Championships in a world leading time of 44.85 s, one of the top ten fastest indoor times ever. He joined his younger brother Mylik Kerley as he anchored the Aggies to a come from behind victory in the  relay. The two first place finishes contributed 20 points to the team, helping bring Texas A&M to their first ever team victory at the NCAA Track and Field Championships, run on their home track. In May, Kerley ran 44.09 s, just 0.09 s off the NCAA record, while easing to the finish line at the Southeastern Conference (SEC) Championships in Columbia, South Carolina. A few weeks later Kerley set the NCAA record in the men's 400 m at the 2017 NCAA West Preliminary with a time of 43.70 s, taking three-tenths of a second off the 44.00 record by Olympic champion Quincy Watts, set almost 25 years earlier. Kerley had met Watts just before the race. He concluded his amateur career to win the 400 m and  relay at the 2017 NCAA Division I Championships in June.

Career

2017

A few weeks later in June 2017, Kerley won the 400 m at the USATF Championships in 44.03 seconds, qualifying to represent the United States in both the 400 m and the  relay at the World Championships in Athletics. After winning his heat he finished third in his semi, but qualified for the final on time. In the final he was unable to replicate his form from earlier in the season, finishing seventh in a time of 45.23 s. He came back a day later to help the US qualify for the finals in the relay, and then a few days later earned a silver medal behind Trinidad and Tobago.

2018
In 2018, Kerley came back from an injury to win the Diamond League trophy in the men's 400 meters.

After Kerley turned professional in 2017 he joined club ALTIS in Phoenix, Arizona, and trained there under the guidance of Kevin Tyler for the 2018 season. However, in 2019 he returned to Texas A&M to train under his former coach Alleyne Francique, stating to Track & Field News "I believe in him so much that I had to come back to train with him."

2021
Kerley made his 2021 outdoor debut March 20 at the Tropical Park Elite Sprints Meet in Tropical Park, Florida with a pair of personal bests in the 100 m, 10.15 s in the heats and 10.11 s in the final, and then improved that time twice again at the Pure Athletics Spring Invitational in Clermont, Florida on April 4 with times of 10.06 in the heats and 10.03 to win the final.

Kerley achieved his first sub-10 in the 100 m at the TRUfit Classic in Miami on April 24, winning in 9.91 s with a maximum allowable wind velocity for record purposes (+2.0 m/s).<ref>[https://www.lequipe.fr/Athletisme/Actualites/Mpm-du-100m-pour-l-americain-fred-kerley-en-9-91/1246501 "MPM du 100m pour l'Américain Fred Kerley en 991"]. L'Équipe. April 26, 2021. Retrieved May 20, 2021.</ref> On May 19 he won the men's 100 m in 9.96 s at the Golden Spike in Ostrava, finishing ahead of former Olympic and World champion Justin Gatlin who settled for second in 10.08 s. Kerley also ran in the 200 m where he placed second with a time of 20.27 s, trailing Kenny Bednarek from the start who won in 19.93 s. According to Reuters,'' Kerley was satisfied with his performances, but thought there was more work to do in his 200 m and his focus for the Olympic Trials would be 400 m.

On June 27, 2021, during the 2021 US Olympic Trials 200m final, Kerley ran a 19.90 his first sub-20 in the 200m. With this performance, Fred Kerley becomes the 3rd athlete to join the "Sub 10s, 20s, 44s club for the 100m, 200m & 400m sprints". The other 2 being the 400m World Record holder Wayde van Niekerk & Michael Norman.

2022
While competing in the 2022 World Athletics Championships, Kerley won his maiden individual World Championship gold medal in the 100m. Kerley registered his third consecutive sub-9.8 second performance in the heats, running a time of 9.79 seconds. In the final, Kerley pipped compatriot Marvin Bracy on the line with a time of 9.86 seconds winning the world title in the process. Fellow American Trayvon Bromell finished third, completing a clean sweep.

Statistics
Information from World Athletics profile unless otherwise noted.

Personal bests

International championship results

Circuit wins and titles
 Diamond League 400 meters champion: 2018
 Diamond League 100 meters champion: 2021
 2018 (400m): Rome Golden Gala, Birmingham Grand Prix, Zürich Weltklasse
 2019 (400m): Shanghai Diamond League (SB)
 2021: Paris Meeting (200m), Brussels Memorial Van Damme (100m), Zürich (100m)
 2022 (100m): Rome
 World Indoor Tour
 2018: Glasgow Indoor Grand Prix

National championship results

NCAA results from Track & Field Results Reporting System.

400 m seasonal bests

Personal life
Kerley's older cousin is former NFL wide receiver Jeremy Kerley.

Notes

References

External links

 (Track & Field Results Reporting System)
 (Track & Field Results Reporting System)

Living people
1995 births
African-American male track and field athletes
American male sprinters
People from Taylor, Texas
Texas A&M Aggies men's track and field athletes
Track and field athletes from Texas
United States collegiate record holders in athletics (track and field)
World Athletics Championships athletes for the United States
World Athletics Championships medalists
World Athletics Championships winners
USA Outdoor Track and Field Championships winners
Diamond League winners
World Athletics Indoor Championships medalists
Athletes (track and field) at the 2020 Summer Olympics
Medalists at the 2020 Summer Olympics
Olympic male sprinters
Olympic silver medalists for the United States in track and field
21st-century African-American sportspeople